Triplicate Girl (Luornu Durgo) is a superhero appearing in DC Comics, primarily as a member of the Legion of Super-Heroes in the 30th and 31st centuries. She has also had the aliases Duo Damsel, Triad, Una, Duplicate Damsel and Duplicate Girl.

Publication history
Luornu Durgo first appeared in Action Comics #276 and was created by producer Jerry Siegel and Jim Mooney.

Fictional character biography

Original continuity
Luornu Durgo, codenamed Triplicate Girl, first appeared in Action Comics #276, written by Jerry Siegel. A native of the planet Cargg, she could split into three identical bodies, as could all Carggites, due to the planet Cargg having three suns. She was the daughter of Humre and Silvou Durgo. Her costume consisted of a purple dress, orange cape and belt, and black boots.

She was the fourth hero to join the Legion of Super-Heroes, and its first non-founder member. Unlike her post–Zero Hour counterpart, Triad, she had brown eyes, not split purple/orange ones. For a long time, she had an unrequited crush on Superboy.

One of her three bodies was killed by Brainiac 5's killer creation Computo, and she was thereafter known as Duo Damsel. Her surviving two bodies continued to remember the trauma of experiencing her/their death, with the result that Computo was the one villain whom Duo Damsel was too frightened to confront.

Duo Damsel later donned a unique half orange, half purple costume which could divide with her, leaving one body wearing an orange costume and one wearing a purple costume. It was designed by a fan, Nick Pascale, who also plotted the story in which it appeared. The costume originally appeared in Adventure Comics #403 (April 1971), and was initially designed to aid her in a mission on the planet Pasnic, but the character continued to wear "splitting" costumes such as this throughout all her continuity. And an adaptation of it was designed when she became Triad and Duplicate Girl. The adaptation was even in the cartoon version of the Legion.

Duo Damsel left active Legion service to become a reservist after marrying fellow Legionnaire Bouncing Boy in Superboy #200 (February 1974); after this she then appeared only sporadically.

In later years of the first Legion continuity she served as an instructor at the Legion Academy along with her husband. She suffered the death of one of her two remaining bodies battling the Time Trapper after she took part in a conspiracy to avenge the death of Superboy, which had been caused by the Trapper (after a minor reboot in 1990, it was stated that Glorith killed the second body during a conspiracy to avenge her genocidal destruction of the Daxamite race). It was revealed that Luornu's second body was still alive. This body, and the ability to duplicate herself, were restored to her, and she gained a new ability to generate force fields. This new ability was transferred to her by a special force field belt given to her by Brainiac 5 to protect her after the supposed death of her second body.

During the "Five Year Gap" following the Magic Wars, Earth fell under the covert control of the Dominators, and withdrew from the United Planets. A few years later, the members of the Dominators' highly classified "Batch SW6" escaped captivity. Originally, Batch SW6 appeared to be a group of teenage Legionnaire clones, created from samples apparently taken just prior to Ferro Lad's death at the hands of the Sun-Eater. Later, they were revealed to be time-paradox duplicates, every bit as legitimate as their older counterparts. After Earth was destroyed in a disaster reminiscent of the destruction of Krypton over a millennium earlier, a few dozen surviving cities and their inhabitants reconstituted their world as New Earth. The SW6 Legionnaires remained, and their version of Triplicate Girl (with all three of her bodies intact) assumed the code name Triad.

Zero Hour Reboot

After the events of the Zero Hour mini-series in 1994, the Legion's original continuity ended and their story began again from scratch.

The native inhabitants of the planet Cargg can split into three separate bodies. In most cases, these bodies are identical — physically, intellectually, and emotionally. Such was not the case for Luornu Durgo.

Even as a newborn, when only two of her cried, her three personalities were clear. Because of the shame of this on a world where this was considered a serious defect, her father left when she was a young child, and her mother degenerated into alcoholism and, eventually, suicide. She was raised by her grandmother, who secretly had the same "condition", but when she eventually died, Luornu was placed in an asylum, where the treatment basically consisted of torturing the three of her into acting the same way. After she began to show signs of "progress", she was allowed into the garden, where she escaped by climbing over the wall at the first opportunity. She ran until, tired, hungry, and drenched by the rain, she ended up at a spaceport. Desperate for shelter, she tried to break into one of the ships there — and found R.J. Brande inside. Seeing she was in trouble, instead of handing her over to the Carggite authorities, he took her to Earth and gave her a job in his office, the HQ of Brande Industries. When he found out about her treatment by the Carggities, he threatened to move several factories until they made him her legal guardian.

When Brande was saved by three teenagers, and got the idea for the Legion of Super-Heroes from his extensive collection of superheroic memorabilia, it was Luornu who he sent to collect the three of them, and she was co-opted as a member soon after, taking the codename Triad.

Other than the year the Legion was disbanded — which she spent as Brande Industries head, while Brande supervised the construction of Legion World — she has remained one of the Legion's most consistent members.

"Threeboot"

In 2005 the Legion's continuity was restarted again. Triplicate Girl is the only inhabitant of the planet Cargg. Her origin is a mystery. All she recalls is waking up alone amongst the ruins of her planet. After weeks of loneliness, she discovers that she has the ability to divide herself into three, thus the three of them then became nine, twenty-seven, and so on with each individual having a shared consciousness. Eventually she hit her limit, but by then, her entire planet was repopulated with replicates of herself. When a United Planets craft arrives on Cargg, three of these replicates are sent out as emissaries. When they returned, the other replicates considered them "tainted", because they'd been places the other hadn't and met with beings who weren't replicates of themselves. These new experiences made them grow as people, and thus they were no longer true replicates, so the three merged into one being and were exiled, and she/they soon joined the Legion as Triplicate Girl.

The Lightning Saga and Countdown

During "The Lightning Saga" storyline of 2007, the Justice League of America and the Justice Society came across what appeared to be Triplicate Girl, dressed in her original Adventure Comics costume, inside an abandoned base once used by the Secret Society of Super Villains deep within Suicide Swamp. Triplicate Girl introduced her "selves" and explained that the Legion had returned to the past to stop the birth of Computo, "the world's first psychopathic artificial intelligence". She claimed that the "spark of life" that created Computo came from the technology within the Secret Society's base. Computo suddenly activated and battled the combined teams, killing one of Triplicate Girl's duplicate bodies just as it had in the original Adventure Comics run. Superman realized he had been there for that battle many years before, and he and Power Girl discovered that Triplicate Girl and Computo had both in fact been an elaborate illusion created by Sensor Girl to throw the two 21st-century teams off the trail of the Legionnaires.

At the conclusion of the "Lightning Saga", a shadowy figure appeared to Karate Kid as he prepared to return to the 31st century with his fellow Legionnaires, and told him he still had a mission to complete. This figure has since been revealed to be the "real" Triplicate Girl, who is joining Karate Kid on his mission in the past. In Countdown #41 she and Karate Kid still have a mission to complete in the 21st century. With her duplicates gone, she now calls herself "Una".

Una and Karate Kid visit Barbara Gordon to learn the secret of Val's illness. Oracle is unable to identify it, and directs them to see a Mr. Orr. When they reach Orr's compound, Val and Una are briefly forced into combat with Equus, until Orr arrives. Orr tells them that Karate Kid's illness is similar to the OMAC virus and, under Desaad's order, tells them to see a professor Buddy Blank.

While en route to seeing Blank, the train they are on is derailed by the vengeful Equus, who has also tricked the police into thinking the heroes are metahuman bioweapons. Supergirl arrives on the scene, but believing what the police believe, attacks Karate Kid, until her suppressed memories of the "Threeboot" Legion overwhelm her mind. Equus then throws a train car at her. Supergirl recovers and defeats Equus. Following the battle, there are some questions asked about the inconsistencies of Supergirl's memories. Val and Una then meet Buddy Blank and his grandson, who take them to see Brother Eye, who scans Val, and directs the group to Blüdhaven, where it detected a similar viral strain. Brother Eye later activates and begins assimilating nearby objects to grow larger and attacks with new OMACs. Shortly thereafter, it activates a Boom Tube and travels to Apokolips, taking the two Legionaires with it. On the planet, the two escape to the streets, but then Eye transfigures Una into an OMAC. With Brother Eye's defeat at the hands of the Pied Piper, Una is freed, but not before having beaten Karate Kid into submission and handing him to Brother Eye for experimentations. The whole party of heroes brought back to Earth, Una pleads with the others to save Karate Kid, even if the general consensus is to kill him before the Morticoccus virus spreads. Upon Val's death, the Morticoccus virus enters the atmosphere, turning humans savage and animals more human-like. Una helps Buddy Blank retrieve his grandson, sacrificing herself along the way for them by defending them from mutated rats. Her last act is to give Buddy her flight ring, so that he and his grandson can escape the city.

The bodies of Una and Karate Kid are eventually discovered by the Gotham City Police Department on New Earth, and Superman and the visiting Lightning Lad mourn their death.  However, Una's fellow stranded Legionnaire, Starman, tells them: "Don't worry about Luornu...Triplicate! Duo! Una! Wait until you see what happens to her!

Legion of 3 Worlds
In the final issue of the Final Crisis: Legion of 3 Worlds series, Luornu returns to assist the Legion in battle with the Legion of Super-Villains, revealing that she has gained the ability to create vast numbers of duplicate bodies, and now goes by the name "Duplicate Damsel". She and Bouncing Boy have just returned from their honeymoon. She also reveals that Una was the second and last of her original duplicates.  In subsequent New Earth appearances she uses the name "Duplicate Girl".

In the "Watchmen" sequel "Doomsday Clock", Triplicate Girl is among the Legion of Super-Heroes members that appear in the present after Doctor Manhattan undid the experiment that erased the Legion of Super-Heroes and the Justice Society of America.

Powers and abilities
Triplicate Girl has the ability to split into three identical bodies. When Triplicate Girl merges into one body, she gains the memories and knowledge that her divided selves obtained.

In post-Zero Hour continuity, Triad's separate selves can be physically identified by eye color, hair, and outfit — the integrated Triad (and Triad-White) have one orange and one purple eye, Triad-Orange has two orange eyes, and Triad-Purple has two purple eyes. In terms of personality, Triad-Orange tends to be shyer, and Triad-Purple is more aggressive, than Triad-White, with the integrated Triad behaving similarly to Triad-White. She tends to wear clothes which make it clear which of her is which, and is also a practitioner of Tri-Jitsu, the fighting ability of strategic blows with three different bodies.

In the "Threeboot" continuity, the "prime" Triplicate Girl, who remained on Cargg, can divide into numerous bodies (100000000 copies). Her costume is reminiscent of her original portrayal (before the orange and purple design) and is identical on each of her three bodies. Early on in this series, no distinction between her different selves was apparent; however, that changed when two of her selves walked in on the third kissing Element Lad. Later issues have suggested that this relationship has continued.

In the New Earth Continuity she has the ability to split into as many bodies as she chooses. The upper limit of her splitting has not been determined.

Equipment
As a member of the Legion of Super-Heroes, she is provided a Legion Flight Ring. It allows her to fly and protects her from the vacuum of space and other dangerous environments.

In other media

Television
 Luornu Durgo as Triplicate Girl makes a non-speaking cameo appearance in the Superman: The Animated Series episode "New Kids In Town".
 Luornu Durgo as Triplicate Girl and sporting Triad's white/orange/purple coloration appears in Legion of Super Heroes (2006), voiced by Kari Wahlgren. In season two, Durgo's white self is killed due to a time anomaly, leaving the surviving pair to go by "Duo Damsel". After the Legion emerge victorious in a time travel-based conflict against Brainiac, the timeline and Durgo's white self are restored.

Film
Luornu Durgo as Triplicate Girl appears in Legion of Super-Heroes (2023), voiced by Daisy Lightfoot. This version is a Legion Academy trainee. While fighting the Dark Circle, a third of Durgo is killed by Mon-El.

Reception
Luornu Durgo was ranked 33rd in Comics Buyer's Guide's 100 Sexiest Women in Comics list.

References

External links
 A Hero History Of Triplicate Girl/Duo Damsel

Comics characters introduced in 1961
Characters created by Jerry Siegel
Characters created by Jim Mooney
DC Comics aliens
DC Comics extraterrestrial superheroes
DC Comics female superheroes
Fictional characters who can duplicate themselves
Fictional characters with dissociative identity disorder